Chase David Wayne Briscoe (born December 15, 1994) is an American professional stock car racing driver. He competes full-time in the NASCAR Cup Series, driving the No. 14 Ford Mustang for Stewart-Haas Racing. He also owns a World of Outlaws sprint car racing team, Chase Briscoe Racing. He won the 2016 ARCA Racing Series championship.

Racing career

Early career
Briscoe's father, Kevin, initially did not allow Briscoe to race. He later relented, letting Chase race as a way of spending family time. Five years later, he returned to racing, driving 410 sprint cars at the age of 13. That year, he recorded 17 top-ten finishes and a win at the final race of the season; he became the youngest driver to win a 410 sprint car race, beating NASCAR champion Jeff Gordon's record by one year despite racing with an engine from 1993.

In 2013, Briscoe applied for the Peak Stock Car Dream Challenge, a contest rewarding the winner with a ride at Michael Waltrip Racing. Despite winning the majority of on-track races, he finished second behind Patrick Staropoli in the challenge. Then-Michael Waltrip Racing executive Ty Norris told Briscoe after the fact that even though he did not win the challenge, Briscoe should still pursue a racing career. Later in the year, he made his NASCAR K&N Pro Series West debut at NAPA Speedway where he finished eighth. He ran two more races in the series that season, finishing 13th and 27th at Kern County Raceway Park and Phoenix International Raceway, respectively. Briscoe moved from Indiana to Charlotte, North Carolina in 2014 in hopes of making connections in the racing world.

2015–2017
In 2015, Briscoe was contacted by friend and driver Christopher Bell regarding a contract with Roush Fenway Racing, which resulted in a test session with ARCA Racing Series team Cunningham Motorsports. Team owner Kerry Scherer called Briscoe about the tests while Briscoe was driving back to Indiana from Charlotte, having given up on his racing career. After two tests at Mobile International Speedway and Fairgrounds Speedway, he made his ARCA debut at Lucas Oil Raceway at Indianapolis where he finished tenth. In his second ARCA start at Salem Speedway, he qualified seventh and later finished fifth. Briscoe struck up a personal friendship with Briggs Cunningham III near the end of the 2015 season and was offered a full-season ride for 2016, which Briscoe accepted. He won six races throughout the course of the season and won the 2016 championship by 535 points over runner-up Tom Hessert.

 In 2017, Briscoe joined the newly formed Ford Performance NASCAR Driver Development Program and the Camping World Truck Series team Brad Keselowski Racing, driving the No. 29 Cooper Standard-sponsored Ford F-150 full-time. Briscoe finished third at Daytona in his Truck Series debut by avoiding a tremendous wreck on the final lap after running top ten almost all day. Briscoe earned his first-career Truck Series pole award at Dover International Speedway and finished 12th in the event. Later in the season, Briscoe earned his first career win at Homestead-Miami Speedway. He was named the Truck Series' Most Popular Driver in 2017. BKR shut down after the season, leaving Briscoe without a ride. Before the 2017 season, Briscoe was offered a ride by Hendrick Motorsports but did not bring enough sponsorship to take advantage of the offer.

2018–2020
In 2018, Briscoe ran a part-time schedule in the NASCAR Xfinity Series. Briscoe ran races in both the No. 60 Ford of Roush Fenway Racing and the No. 98 Ford of Stewart-Haas Racing. Later that year, Briscoe won the inaugural Xfinity race on the Charlotte Roval race after holding off Justin Marks and Austin Cindric. Briscoe also returned to the Truck Series for 1 race in 2018, driving the No. 27 truck for ThorSport Racing in the race at Eldora Speedway, which he won in a photo finish over teammate Grant Enfinger. He would return to the same truck and team for the same race the following year and would finish 7th.

Briscoe committed to a full-time Xfinity schedule in SHR's No. 98 in 2019. In July, Briscoe earned his second career Xfinity Series win at Iowa Speedway. He qualified for the 2019 NASCAR Xfinity Series Playoffs, on the back of posting 10 straight top 10 finishes. Briscoe finished the 2019 season fifth in points after finishing third at Homestead.

After sponsorship troubles threatened to take Briscoe out of the seat, he secured enough funding to run the 2020 NASCAR Xfinity Series season. Briscoe won the rain-delayed Boyd Gaming 300 at Las Vegas Motor Speedway; he led 27 of 50 laps before weather forced the remainder of the race to be postponed, followed by 62 laps on Sunday for a race-high 89 laps led en route to the victory. At Darlington, after his wife suffered a miscarriage, Briscoe earned his fourth career Xfinity Series win after holding off Kyle Busch. He recorded additional victories at Homestead, Pocono Raceway, Indianapolis Motor Speedway, Dover International Speedway, Bristol, Las Vegas in the fall, and Kansas; the Indianapolis win came in the inaugural race on the track's infield road course. In the final race at Phoenix, he fell behind the other three championship drivers due to a poor-handling car and spun with two laps remaining. Briscoe finished the race in ninth to conclude the season with a fourth-place points finish. His nine wins led all drivers in 2020, were the most by a Ford driver in the series, and the second highest by a non-Cup driver since Sam Ard in 1983.

2021

On October 20, 2020, Stewart-Haas Racing announced that Briscoe would be promoted to the Cup Series in 2021, replacing Clint Bowyer in the No. 14 Ford Mustang. HighPoint.com, which sponsored Briscoe's Xfinity car, followed him to the Cup team. He recorded his first top ten at Circuit of the Americas as he finished sixth.

In March, Briscoe returned to the Truck Series to compete in the inaugural Bristol dirt race, where he drove the No. 04 for Roper Racing. He would return to the team for the races at Kansas and Knoxville. In May, Briscoe returned to the Xfinity Series and drove the No. 99 for B. J. McLeod Motorsports in a collaboration with Stewart-Haas Racing at Charlotte. In June, Briscoe returned to the West Series (now the ARCA Menards Series West) for the first time since 2013 when he drove in the race at Sonoma Raceway in preparation for his first Cup Series start at the track the next day. Briscoe's entry was for the same team (Stewart-Haas Racing) with the same car number (the No. 14) and crew chief (Johnny Klausmeier) as in the Cup Series. The car that Briscoe drove was a leftover Ford from Chad Bryant's closed team, and as part of the agreement to use the car, Bryant was the listed owner. He went on to lead every single lap in that race en route to the win. Briscoe then entered the main ARCA Series race at Watkins Glen. According to a pre-race TV interview with Briscoe, his No. 14 ARCA car was brought to Sonoma and Watkins Glen on the Cup Series No. 14 team's hauler instead of a Cup Series backup car. Briscoe would lead nine laps in the Watkins Glen race before exiting the race from the lead with a suspension issue and finishing 23rd.

Briscoe had a breakout race in the inaugural Verizon 200 at the Brickyard, leading most of the early stage and running in the top five. After the final restart, Briscoe was forced off the track by Denny Hamlin in turn one but rejoined, earning a penalty. Briscoe spun Hamlin out later that same lap, leading to controversy as Briscoe possibly did not know he was penalized. Briscoe finished 26th after being parked by NASCAR. He finished 23rd in the final standings and won Rookie of the Year honors.

2022

Briscoe and the No. 14 Stewart-Haas Racing team earned a sponsorship from Mahindra Tractors for the majority of the season. Briscoe began the 2022 season with a 22nd place finish at the 2022 Busch Light Clash at The Coliseum. He placed third at the 2022 Daytona 500, missing out on the win by 0.091 seconds to Bubba Wallace and winner Austin Cindric. Briscoe won his first Cup Series race at Phoenix on March 13. He led 101 out of 312 laps enroute to his maiden victory, becoming the 200th different driver in series history to have won a race in the Cup Series. Briscoe was eliminated following the Round of 8 after finishing 10th at Martinsville. He finished the season at a career-best ninth in the points standings.

Personal life
Briscoe's father Kevin and grandfather Richard are both involved in sprint car racing, Kevin being a former Truck Series driver and a five-time track champion at Tri-State Speedway and Bloomington Speedway, while Richard has worked as a car owner for drivers like Rich Vogler and Dave Blaney. He met and became friends with fellow driver Christopher Bell on iRacing.

Briscoe is an active user of Reddit and frequently interacts with fans on the NASCAR subreddit.

He is married to his wife Marissa. They were expecting their first child in 2020, but Marissa suffered a miscarriage in May of that year. Almost a year later on March 25, 2021, Marissa announced on Twitter that she was pregnant with a boy. On October 2, 2021, Marissa gave birth to their son, Brooks Briscoe. 

He is not related to fellow racing driver Ryan Briscoe nor to Ryan's wife Nicole Briscoe.

Motorsports career results

NASCAR
(key) (Bold – Pole position awarded by qualifying time. Italics – Pole position earned by points standings or practice time. * – Most laps led. ** – All laps led.)

Cup Series

Daytona 500

Xfinity Series

Camping World Truck Series

ARCA Menards Series
(key) (Bold – Pole position awarded by qualifying time. Italics – Pole position earned by points standings or practice time. * – Most laps led.)

ARCA Menards Series West

 Season still in progress 
 Ineligible for series points

References

External links

 
 Official profile at Stewart-Haas Racing
 
 Peak Stock Car Dream Challenge bio

Living people
1994 births
People from Mitchell, Indiana
ARCA Menards Series drivers
NASCAR drivers
Racing drivers from Indiana
RFK Racing drivers
Stewart-Haas Racing drivers
Multimatic Motorsports drivers
Michelin Pilot Challenge drivers